Pablo Cuevas was the defending champion, however he chose not to participate this year.

Rui Machado won the title, defeating Federico Delbonis 6–4, 6–4 in the final.

Seeds

Draw

Finals

Top half

Bottom half

External links
Main Draw
Qualifying Draw

Tennis Napoli Cup - Singles
2010 Singles